The 2017–18 Cornell Big Red men's basketball team represented Cornell University during the 2017–18 NCAA Division I men's basketball season. The Big Red, led by second-year head coach Brian Earl, played their home games at Newman Arena in Ithaca, New York as members of the Ivy League. They finished the season 12–16, 6–8 in Ivy League play to finish in fourth place. They lost in the semifinals of the Ivy League tournament to Harvard.

Previous season 
The Big Red finished the 2016–17 season 8–21, 4–10 in Ivy League play to finish in a three-way tie for last place. They failed to qualify for the inaugural Ivy League tournament.

Offseason

Departures

Incoming transfers

2017 recruiting class

Roster

Schedule and results

|-
!colspan=9 style=| Exhibition

|-
!colspan=9 style=| Non-conference regular season

|-
!colspan=9 style=| Ivy League regular season

|-
!colspan=9 style=| Ivy League tournament

Source

References

Cornell Big Red men's basketball seasons
Cornell
Cornell Big Red men's basketball
Cornell Big Red men's basketball